Mats Gunnar Hessel (born 13 March 1961) is an ice hockey player who played for the Swedish national team. He won a bronze medal at the 1984 Winter Olympics. He played mostly for AIK in Stockholm and won two Swedish championships with them in 1982 and 1985.

Career statistics

Regular season and playoffs

International

References 

1961 births
Living people
Ice hockey players at the 1984 Winter Olympics
Olympic bronze medalists for Sweden
Olympic ice hockey players of Sweden
Olympic medalists in ice hockey
Medalists at the 1984 Winter Olympics
AIK IF players
Rögle BK players